Mildred Barry Hughes (February 11, 1902 – January 11, 1995) was an American Democratic Party politician who served in the New Jersey General Assembly and became the first woman elected to the New Jersey Senate in 1965.

Politics 
She was elected to the New Jersey General Assembly, as a Democrat, in 1957, 1959, 1961, and 1963. She became assistant majority leader in 1960 and 1961. When she won her Senate seat in 1965, she was the first Democrat from Union County, New Jersey, to be elected to the Senate in 75 years. She died on January 11, 1995, in Cranford, New Jersey.

She was known for sponsoring the following laws and acts:
 revision of the state's Food and Drug Act
 state's first "Good Samaritan" act to protect from lawsuits those who aided accident victims
 control billboards 
 to aid nursing schools 
 to assist mental health organizations
 a uniform Drinking Age of 21

Personal life 
She was born as Mildred Barry in Elizabeth, New Jersey, and married Peter L. Hughes II (1902–1971) and had three children: Peter L. Hughes III, W. Barry Hughes, and David J. Hughes.

References

External links
Rutgers: Mildred Barry Hughes

1902 births
1995 deaths
Democratic Party New Jersey state senators
Politicians from Elizabeth, New Jersey
People from Union Township, Union County, New Jersey
Women state legislators in New Jersey
Democratic Party members of the New Jersey General Assembly
20th-century American politicians
20th-century American women politicians